The following is a list of the 25 cantons of the Calvados department, in France, following the French canton reorganisation which came into effect in March 2015:

 Bayeux
 Cabourg
 Caen-1
 Caen-2
 Caen-3
 Caen-4
 Caen-5
 Condé-en-Normandie
 Courseulles-sur-Mer
 Évrecy
 Falaise
 Hérouville-Saint-Clair
 Le Hom
 Honfleur-Deauville
 Ifs
 Lisieux
 Livarot-Pays-d'Auge
 Mézidon Vallée d'Auge
 Les Monts d'Aunay
 Ouistreham
 Pont-l'Évêque
 Thue et Mue
 Trévières
 Troarn
 Vire Normandie

References